John Raymond Evans (12 September 1911 – 8 March 1943) was a Welsh international rugby union hooker who played club rugby for Newport. Evans joined Newport after showing promise as a Welsh Schools players, winning three caps while at Newport High School. Evans captained Newport on two occasions, once in 1935/36 season and again in 1936/37. In 1935 Evans captained Newport against the touring New Zealand team.

Evans made his one and only international appearance against England in the 1934 Home Nations Championship, and was given the captaincy. He was one of 13 new caps to play for Wales, with only Claude Davey and Dai Thomas with any past international experience. Wales came a poor second, losing 9-0. The selectors were severely criticized for their choice, not only because of the teams inexperience, but also because seven of the team played their rugby outside Wales. Evans was one of five players from the Welsh team that day that became one cap wonders.

Evans was killed in action while serving his country in North Africa during the Second World War. Whilst serving in 3rd Battalion, Parachute Regiment, Evans parachuted into French Tunisia in November 1942 and was fatally shot by a sniper while defending Sedjenane crossroads in March 1943.

International matches played
Wales
  1934

Bibliography

References

80 seasons at Amersham and Chiltern RFC

1911 births
1943 deaths
Welsh rugby union players
Wales international rugby union players
Rugby union hookers
Wales rugby union captains
Rugby union players from Newport, Wales
British Army personnel killed in World War II
Newport RFC players
Barbarian F.C. players
British Parachute Regiment officers
Deaths by firearm in Tunisia
Welsh military personnel
People educated at Newport High School